C. Ramachandra Menon was a South Indian cinematographer known for more than 150 films in Malayalam and Tamil. He was the cinematographer for the film Ummachu, based on the novel of the same name, and is known for his work on Eeta and Ningalenne Communistakki. He frequently worked with Sreekumaran Thambi, P. Bhaskaran and Kunchacko on films in Malayalam.

Personal life and career
He was the son of P. K. M. Raja of Thiruvannoor Kovilakam and Chengalath Janakiyamma in 1929 at Kozhikode. He worked with Markus Bartley; Masthan; and Malli Irani at Vahini Studios, Chennai. In 1956, he went to Singapore. There, he worked with Singapore Television for around six years making Malay films. He returned home in 1970 and worked at Udaya studio. He was married to Manchapora Malathi, and had two children: Maya Harigovind (married to Chengalath Harigovind) and Dr. Goutham Menon (married to Dr. Maureen Rubin).  He died on 9 May 2017.

Filmography

References

1929 births
Kozhikode
2017 deaths
Cinematographers from Kerala